Amne may refer to:
 4-oxalocrotonate decarboxylase, an enzyme
 Amné, a commune in north-western France
 Amne Machin, a mountain peak in China
 Amne, Inc., a US-based real estate technology company founded in 2016